Lake Vernon is located in the Tiltill Valley in the northern sector of Yosemite National Park just north of Hetch Hetchy Valley. Due to the remote location of the lake, it is usually only accessed as a backpacking destination. The area surrounding the lake was once home to a band of Sierra Miwok Indians, and numerous artifacts can be found in the area. Lake Vernon is the source of Falls Creek, which feeds Wapama Falls.

See also
List of lakes in California

References

Lakes of Yosemite National Park
Lakes of Tuolumne County, California